Schöpstal is a municipality in the district Görlitz, Saxony, Germany. It consists of the villages of Ebersbach, Girbigsdorf, Kunnersdorf and Liebstein, which are Waldhufendörfer located along the river Weißer Schöps.

References 

Populated places in Görlitz (district)